Silver Patriarch (8 May 1994 – 11 October 2009) was a racehorse, winner of the 1997 St Leger and of seven other races. He was ridden by Pat Eddery in all but three of his races.

The horse was bred in Ireland, by Saddlers' Hall and out of the American horse Early Rising, but was trained in Britain by John Dunlop.  After winning two of his four starts as a two-year-old, at Newmarket and Pontefract, he finished third in the Sandown Classic Trial at Sandown Park in April 1997, before winning the Lingfield Derby Trial and being touched off by a short head by Benny the Dip in an extremely tight finish to the 1997 Epsom Derby.  He would go on to have a more successful career than the horse who beat him, who would not win any of his three subsequent races.

Silver Patriarch started favourite for the 1997 Irish Derby, but finished a disappointing fifth to Desert King, beaten thirteen lengths.  He then came second to Stowaway in the Great Voltigeur Stakes at York, beaten half a length, before winning the St Leger at Doncaster, for which he had started 5-4 favourite.

As a four-year-old he finished a narrow second to Romanov in the Jockey Club Stakes at Newmarket, but won the 1998 Coronation Cup from Swain at Epsom in June, succeeding over the course and distance where he had been so narrowly defeated the previous year.  He remained a consistent performer, though he was well beaten in the 1998 King George VI and Queen Elizabeth Stakes at Ascot, won by Swain for the second consecutive year.  At five, he won the Jockey Club Stakes and the Geoffrey Freer Stakes at Newbury, in which he had finished second in 1998, and came fourth (though only beaten two and a quarter lengths) in the Coronation Cup, won by Daylami.  He also finished fourth (though now beaten eight lengths) in the King George, also won by Daylami.  He last raced in Hong Kong in December 1999.
He died, aged 15, of natural causes on 11 October 2009 at the National Stud in Newmarket.

Pedigree

References
 pedigreequery.com – Silver Patriarch's pedigree
 racingpost.co.uk – Silver Patriarch's race record

1994 racehorse births
2009 racehorse deaths
Racehorses bred in Ireland
Racehorses trained in the United Kingdom
Thoroughbred family 2-n
St Leger winners